Events in the year 1610 in Norway.

Incumbents
Monarch: Christian IV

Events
17 June – Prince Christian was proclaimed as heir apparent to Christian IV of Norway, in Oslo.
17 August – Christian IV of Denmark-Norway ordered the construction of Altenhus Fortress near Alta in Finnmark.

Arts and literature

Births

12 May - Arent Berntsen, topographical-statistical author, businessman, banker, estate owner and councillor (died 1680).

Around 1610
Lisbet Nypan, alleged witch (d. 1670).
Hans Hansen Bergen, emigrant from Norway and early/pioneer settler in New Amsterdam (died 1654).

Deaths
5 February – Strange Jørgenssøn, bailiff and businessman (born 1539).

See also

References